IEN Europe (Industrial Engineering News) is a monthly magazine launched in 1975 for industry professionals. It is published by Thomas Industrial Media BVBA.

Circulation
The magazine is free and available only on request for industry professionals. Over 54 000 copies are distributed ten times a year.

References

External links
 Thomas Industrial Media's website
 Thomas Publishing Co's website

Magazines published in Belgium
Engineering magazines
Magazines established in 1975
Mass media in Mechelen
Monthly magazines published in Belgium
Multilingual magazines